Pitcairnia cylindrostachya is a plant species in the genus Pitcairnia. This species is endemic to Mexico.

References

cylindrostachya
Endemic flora of Mexico